John James Pickman (January 9, 1850 – August 17, 1930) was the 33rd mayor of Lowell, Massachusetts. He also served as a member of the Massachusetts House of Representatives.

References

1850 births
1930 deaths
Mayors of Lowell, Massachusetts
Lowell, Massachusetts City Council members
Republican Party members of the Massachusetts House of Representatives
Massachusetts lawyers
Harvard Law School alumni